Tony Sinclair may refer to:

 Tony Sinclair (biologist), Canadian biologist
 Tony Sinclair (footballer), British footballer